Șuie Paparude is a Romanian electronic music band. They are recognized as having a distinct sound and style, comparable with very few other local bands. As such, they were honored with multiple opening acts for internationally acclaimed bands as well as presences to high-profile music festivals, especially from Romania but also across Europe.	
Autumn 93, A. Go Club makes its debut, the atmosphere is alternative-new-wave. Next 6 albums, 9 videos, music video, thousands of concerts, some in the opening of super bands such as Depeche Mode.

Discography
1995 – Șuie Paparude
1997 – Salvează-te
1998 – Musca
2000 – Urban
2003 – Atac la persoane
2005 – Scandalos
2008 – A fost odată...
2010 – E suflet în aparat
2018 – Noul Album

References
 Prodigy

External links
Official website

Musical groups established in 1993
Romanian musical groups
1993 establishments in Romania